Jean Beatrice Forest,  (born July 24, 1926) is a Canadian retired Senator.

Born in Minitonas, Manitoba, she moved to Alberta with her husband Rocky in 1947. She was appointed to Alberta's first Human Rights Commission in 1974 and to the Minister's Advisory Committee on the constitution in 1978. She was Chancellor of the University of Alberta from 1978 to 1982.

She was appointed to the Senate of Canada in 1996 representing Edmonton. She resigned in 1998 because of concerns for her husband's health.

In 1987, she was made an Officer of the Order of Canada in recognition for being "a highly respected educator, businesswoman and active participant in community affairs".

An all-girls Catholic Junior High School started in 2005 in Edmonton, Alberta, is named after Jean Forest, called the Jean Forest Leadership Academy or JFLA.

References

1926 births
Living people
Canadian senators from Alberta
Chancellors of the University of Alberta
Liberal Party of Canada senators
Officers of the Order of Canada